Charles Rice was an American sound engineer. He was nominated for two Academy Awards in the category Sound Recording.

Selected filmography
 Pepe (1960)
 Bye Bye Birdie (1963)

References

External links

Year of birth missing
Year of death missing
American audio engineers